São José dos Campos Basketball, or simply Sao José Basketball, is a Brazilian professional basketball club that is based in São José dos Campos, São Paulo State. The club's full name is Associação Esportiva São José dos Campos Basketball. The club plays in the top-tier level league in Brazil, the Novo Basquete Brasil (NBB).

History
In the 1970s and 1980s, São José was one of the greatest basketball teams in Brazil. In 1980 and 1981 the team won the São Paulo State Championship, plus the Brazilian Basketball Cup (Brazilian Championship), in 1981. But for almost thirty years, São José did not win titles.

In 2009, the team won its third São Paulo State Championship, after a finals series against C.A. Paulistano. After all, the point guard Fúlvio de Assis was chosen the best player. In the following year, São José team was defeated in NBB by C.R. Flamengo in the quarterfinal series, by 3–0.

In the same year, Limeira eliminated São José in the São Paulo State Championship, again in the quarterfinals series. In 2011, São José racked up another two defeats, this time in the quarterfinal series of NBB, after a series against Franca, and in the final series of the state championship, won by E.C. Pinheiros. In the 2011–12 NBB season, São José did its best campaign in years, reaching the final of the championship. In previous series, eliminated the executioners Franca and Flamengo, in the quarterfinals and semifinals series, respectively. But in the finals game, São José was defeated by Brasília.

Roster

Corrent roster

Honors and titles

Continental
 South American Club Championship
 Runners-up (1): 1981

National
 Brazilian Championship:
 Champions (1): 1981 (I)
 Runners-up (1): 2012
 Brazilian 2nd Division:
 Runners-up (1): 2018

Regional
 São Paulo State Championship
Champions (5): 1980, 1981, 2009, 2012, 2015
Runners-up (2): 1952, 2011
Campeonato Paulista A2:
Champions (1): 2005

Other sports
Other sports sections at the club include: association football, futsal, martial arts, golf, gymnastics, swimming and tennis, among others.

References

External links
Official website 
New Basket Brazil Profile 
Latinbasket.com Profile

Basketball teams in Brazil
Novo Basquete Brasil
Basketball teams established in 1948
Basketball in São Paulo (state)